Jarbi Álvarez (born November 1, 1976) is a Belizean professional football defender. He currently plays for the Guatemalan lower league side CSD Sayaxche.

International career
Nicknamed Maestro, Álvarez made his debut for Belize in a June 2004 FIFA World Cup qualification match against Canada. He earned a total of 5 caps, scoring no goals.
Álvarez has represented Belize in two FIFA World Cup qualification matches and played at the UNCAF Nations Cup 2005.

His final international match was against Nicaragua at that UNCAF Cup tournament in February 2005.

External links

References

1976 births
Living people
Association football defenders
Belizean footballers
Belize international footballers
Belizean expatriate footballers
Expatriate footballers in Guatemala
2005 UNCAF Nations Cup players